Andrew James Hogg (born 2 March 1985) is a retired professional footballer who plays as a goalkeeper for Maltese side Birkirkara. Born in England, he earned more than 60 caps for the Malta national team.

References

External links 
 

1985 births
Living people
Footballers from Kingston upon Thames
People with acquired Maltese citizenship
Maltese footballers
Malta international footballers
English people of Maltese descent
English footballers
Pietà Hotspurs F.C. players
Valletta F.C. players
Enosis Neon Paralimni FC players
AEL Kalloni F.C. players
Maltese expatriate footballers
Expatriate footballers in Cyprus
Expatriate footballers in Greece
Association football goalkeepers
Maltese Premier League players
Super League Greece players
Cypriot First Division players
Malta under-21 international footballers
Hibernians F.C. players
Competitors at the 2005 Mediterranean Games
Mediterranean Games competitors for Malta